What Happened on Twenty-third Street, New York City is a 1901 American short film.

Plot 
The 77 second film depicts a woman, escorted by a man, walking over a grate. The hot air lifts her skirt, she laughs and they walk on.

Comparisons 

In 2001, Rosemary Hanes and Brian Taves compared the sequence to the iconic image of Marilyn Monroe in a white dress in the 1955 film The Seven Year Itch, writing "With The Seven Year Itch (1955), the image of Marilyn Monroe's thighs exposed under her billowing skirt entered American popular culture. The Library's motion picture and broadcasting collections provide the opportunity to document not only how women's roles and their depictions have changed throughout the past hundred years, but also how much has remained the same."

Tom Gunning makes another observation, contrasting the two events as narrative devices writing "The act of display [in What Happened...] is both climax and resolution here and does not lead to a series of incidents or the creation of characters with discernible traits. While the similar lifting of Marilyn Monroe's skirt in The Seven Year Itch also provides a moment of spectacle, it simultaneously creates character traits that explain later narrative actions."

See also
Promotional film poster of The Woman in Red (1984 film)

References

External links 

 
 
 

1901 films
American silent short films
1901 comedy films
American short documentary films
Films shot in New York City
American black-and-white films
Films directed by Edwin S. Porter
Silent American comedy films
Documentary films about New York City
Articles containing video clips
1900s short documentary films
1901 in New York City
1900s American films